Samuel Emmanuel Suka (born 10 September 1983) is a retired Beninese football player who last played for Liberty Professionals.

International career
He was part of the Beninese 2004 African Nations Cup team, who finished bottom of their group in the first round of competition, thus failing to secure qualification for the quarter-finals.

References

External links

1983 births
Living people
Beninese footballers
Benin international footballers
Liberty Professionals F.C. players
Expatriate footballers in Ghana
Beninese expatriate footballers
2004 African Cup of Nations players
Association football defenders